Jan Plachý (born 7 May 1998) is a Czech footballer who currently plays as a goalkeeper for Teplice.

Career statistics

Club

Notes

References

1998 births
Living people
Czech footballers
Czech Republic youth international footballers
Association football goalkeepers
FK Teplice players
FK Ústí nad Labem players
Bohemian Football League players
Czech National Football League players